Beverly Hills is a city located in Los Angeles County, California. According to the 2020 census, the city has a population of 32,701; marking a decrease of 1,408 from the 2010 census count of 34,109.

In American popular culture, Beverly Hills has been known primarily as an affluent location within Greater Los Angeles, which corresponds to higher property values and taxes in the area. The city is well known for its Rodeo Drive shopping district that includes many designer brands. Throughout its history, the city has been home to many celebrities. It is also home to numerous hotels and resorts, including the Beverly Hilton and the Beverly Hills Hotel. The city has been featured in many movies, television series, music and media, in the United States and internationally.

After its initial settlement in 1828, Beverly Hills first developed primarily as an agricultural community, originally centered around Rancho Rodeo de las Aguas, a Mexican era rancho grant. Beverly Hills was first incorporated as a city in September 1914 by a group of investors who had failed to find oil but found water instead and eventually decided to develop it into a town.

History

Early history

Gaspar de Portolá arrived in the area that would later become Beverly Hills on August 3, 1769, traveling along native trails which followed the present-day route of Wilshire Boulevard. The area was settled by Maria Rita Quinteros de Valdez and her husband in 1828. They called their  of property the Rancho Rodeo de las Aguas. In 1854, she sold the ranch to Benjamin Davis Wilson (1811–1878) and Henry Hancock (1822–1883).

Henry Hammel and Andrew H. Denker acquired most of it and used it for farming lima beans. At this point, the area was known as the Hammel and Denker Ranch. By 1888, they were planning to build a town called Morocco on their holdings.

20th century

In 1900, Burton E. Green, Charles A. Canfield, Max Whittier, Frank H. Buck, Henry E. Huntington, William G. Kerckhoff, William F. Herrin, W.S. Porter and Frank H. Balch formed the Amalgamated Oil Company, bought the Hammel and Denker ranch, and began looking for oil. They did not find enough to exploit commercially by the standards of the time, though. In 1906, therefore, they reorganized as the Rodeo Land and Water Company, renamed the property "Beverly Hills", subdivided it, and began selling lots. The development was named "Beverly Hills" after Beverly Farms in Beverly, Massachusetts, and because of the hills in the area.

The Los Angeles Times reported on September 2, 1906: 
Percy H. Clark Company are managing the development of the foothill portion of the Hammel & Denker ranch for the Rodeo Land and Water Company (the Canfield-Huntington-Kerckhoff syndicate), to be known as Beverly Hills. No expense is being spared to make this a fine suburban district. . . . The property has been laid out on beautiful curved lines.

The first house in the subdivision was built in 1907, but sales remained slow.

Beverly Hills was one of many all-white planned communities started in the Los Angeles area around this time. Restrictive covenants prohibited non-whites from owning or renting property, unless they were employed as servants by white residents. It was also forbidden to sell or rent property to Jews in Beverly Hills.

Burton Green began construction on The Beverly Hills Hotel in 1911. The hotel was finished in 1912. The visitors drawn by the hotel were inclined to purchase land in Beverly Hills, and by 1914 the population had grown enough to qualify for incorporation as an independent city. That same year, the Rodeo Land and Water Company decided to separate its water business from its real estate business. The Beverly Hills Utility Commission was split off from the land company and incorporated in September 1914, buying all of the utilities-related assets from the Rodeo Land and Water Company.

In 1919, Douglas Fairbanks and Mary Pickford bought land on Summit Drive and built a mansion, finished in 1921 and nicknamed "Pickfair" by the press. The glamour associated with Fairbanks and Pickford as well as other movie stars who built mansions in the city contributed to its growing appeal.

By the early 1920s, the population of Beverly Hills had grown enough to make the water supply a political issue. In 1923, the usual solution, annexation to the city of Los Angeles, was proposed. There was considerable opposition to annexation among such famous residents as Pickford, Fairbanks, Will Rogers and Rudolph Valentino. The Beverly Hills Utility Commission, opposed to annexation as well, managed to force the city into a special election and the plan was defeated 337 to 507.

In 1928, the Beverly Wilshire Apartment Hotel (now the Beverly Wilshire Hotel) opened on Wilshire Boulevard between El Camino and Rodeo drives, part of the old Beverly Hills Speedway. That same year, oilman Edward L. Doheny finished construction of Greystone Mansion, a 55-room mansion meant as a wedding present for his son Edward L. Doheny, Jr. The house is now owned by the city of Beverly Hills and is a designated historical landmark.

In the early 1930s, Santa Monica Park was renamed Beverly Gardens and was extended to span the entire two-mile (3-kilometer) length of Santa Monica Boulevard through the city. The Electric Fountain marks the corner of Santa Monica Blvd. and Wilshire Blvd. with a small sculpture at the top of a Tongva kneeling in prayer. In April 1931, the new Italian Renaissance-style Beverly Hills City Hall was opened.

In the early 1940s, black actors and businessmen had begun to move into Beverly Hills, despite the covenants allowing only whites to live in the city. A neighborhood improvement association attempted to enforce the covenant in court. The defendants included prominent artists Hattie McDaniel, Louise Beavers, and Ethel Waters. Among the white residents supporting the lawsuit against blacks was Harold Lloyd, the silent film star. The NAACP participated in the defense, which was successful. In his decision, federal judge Thurmond Clarke said that it was time that "members of the Negro race are accorded, without reservations or evasions, the full rights guaranteed to them under the 14th amendment." The United States Supreme Court declared restrictive covenants unenforceable in 1948 in Shelley v. Kraemer. A group of Jewish residents of Beverly Hills filed an amicus brief in this case.

In 1956, Paul Trousdale (1915–1990) purchased the grounds of the Doheny Ranch and developed it into the Trousdale Estates, convincing the city of Beverly Hills to annex it. The neighborhood has been home to Elvis Presley, Frank Sinatra, Dean Martin, Tony Curtis, Ray Charles, President Richard Nixon, as well as, in later years, Jennifer Aniston, David Spade, Vera Wang and John Rich.

In the late 1990s, the Los Angeles County Metropolitan Transportation Authority (LACMTA) proposed to build an extension of the Metro Red Line along Wilshire Boulevard and into Downtown Beverly Hills, but the city opposed it.

21st century
In 2001, LACMTA then proposed a bus rapid transit route down Santa Monica Blvd., but this was also opposed by the city and never built. This stretch of road is served by less efficient Metro Rapid buses using pre-existing roadways.  By 2010, traffic in Beverly Hills and surrounding areas had deteriorated enough that the city's habitual opposition had largely turned to support for subways within the city limits. As part of the Westside Subway Extension project, the D Line of the LA Metro Rail was intended in 2013 to be extended through Beverly Hills, adding two underground stations at Wilshire/La Cienega and Wilshire/Rodeo by the 2020s.

The city of Beverly Hills widely opposed Proposition 8, the 2008 ballot measure which repealed legal recognition of same-sex marriages. The proposition narrowly passed statewide, but in Beverly Hills, only 34% voted in favor, and 66% voted against it.

In the midst of the 2015 drought, Beverly Hills was found to be one of the largest water consumers in California. As a result, it was asked by the state to reduce consumption by 36%, prompting many residents to replace their lawns with native plants. Meanwhile, the city government replaced the grass in front of the City Hall with Mexican sage.

In September 2015, the City of Beverly Hills signed an agreement with Israel to work together on water use as well as "cybersecurity, public health, emergency services, disaster preparedness, public safety, counterterrorism and art and culture".

In July 2016, the City of Beverly Hills received the Livability Award from the United States Conference of Mayors for its Ambassador Program, which takes care of the city's homeless population.

The Beverly Hills Community Dog Park was dedicated on September 6, 2016.

Geography

Beverly Hills and the neighboring city of West Hollywood are together entirely surrounded by the city of Los Angeles. Beverly Hills is bordered on the northwest by the Los Angeles neighborhood of Bel-Air and the Santa Monica Mountains, on the east by West Hollywood, the Carthay neighborhood of Los Angeles, and the Fairfax District of Los Angeles, and on the south by the Beverlywood neighborhood of Los Angeles. The area's "Platinum Triangle" is formed by the city of Beverly Hills and the Los Angeles neighborhoods of Bel Air and Holmby Hills.

The ZIP codes for Beverly Hills are 90209, 90210, 90211, 90212 and 90213.

Areas

The Flats
Most residents live in the "flats" of Beverly Hills, which is a relatively flat area that slopes away from the hills, and includes all of Beverly Hills south of Sunset Boulevard and north of Santa Monica Boulevard.

Downtown Beverly Hills
In a triangle between Santa Monica Bl., Wilshire Bl. and Crescent Drive is Downtown Beverly Hills a.k.a. the Golden Triangle, a retail and dining hub attracting locals, and in some sections attracting visitors from across the region and the world. The streets running northwest-to-southeast have distinct characters:
Linden, Roxbury, Bedford and Camden drives, short streets catering to residents' needs, lined with medical offices, bank branches, delicatessens, etc. 
Rodeo Drive, known for high-end boutiques; 
Beverly Drive, lined with upscale chain retailers commonly found in malls, such as Crate and Barrel, The Gap, Sephora, Pottery Barn, lululemon and Allsaints. Some restaurants line Beverly Drive as well.
Cañon and Crescent drives, attracting local and regional shoppers and diners to restaurants such as Spago as well as local favorites, particularly along Cañon; but also catering to local needs, e.g. with a Rite Aid drugstore and a Whole Foods supermarket. Multi-story parking garages are also located along these streets. 
Wilshire Boulevard is lined with the two department stores remaining in the city: Saks Fifth Avenue, and Neiman Marcus. In the past, the upscale department stores Barneys New York, I. Magnin and J. W. Robinson's all had important branches here.

South of Wilshire
South Beverly Drive, i.e. south of Wilshire Blvd., is another dining and shopping hub.

Houses south of Wilshire Boulevard have more urban square and rectangular lots, in general smaller than those to the north. There are also more apartment buildings south of Wilshire Boulevard than anywhere else in Beverly Hills.

Beverly Hills adjacent

Beverly Hills Post Office (BHPO) is the name given to a section directly north of the Beverly Hills city limits that lies within the 90210 ZIP code, assigned to the Beverly Hills Post Office, but is part of the City of Los Angeles.

Along with the Los Angeles communities of Bel-Air and Brentwood, Beverly Hills is one of the "Three Bs", a wealthy area in the Los Angeles Westside.

Climate
Beverly Hills has a warm Mediterranean climate and receives an average  of rain per year. Summers are marked by warm to hot temperatures with very little wind, while winters are mild to moderate, with occasional rain alternating with periods of Santa Ana winds. Measurable snowfall has been recorded only in 1882, 1922, 1932, 1949 and 1958.

Demographics

2010

The 2010 United States Census reported that Beverly Hills had a population of 34,109. The racial makeup of Beverly Hills was 28,112 (82.4%) White (78.6% Non-Hispanic White), 746 (2.2%) African American, 48 (0.1%) Native American, 3,032 (8.9%) Asian, 12 (0.0%) Pacific Islander, 485 (1.4%) from other races, and 1,674 (4.9%) from two or more races. Hispanic or Latino of any race were 1,941 persons (5.7%).

The Census reported that 33,988 people (99.6% of the population) lived in households, 121 (0.4%) lived in non-institutionalized group quarters, and 0 (0%) were institutionalized.

There were 14,869 households, out of which 3,759 (25.3%) had children under the age of 18 living in them, 6,613 (44.5%) were opposite-sex married couples living together, 1,354 (9.1%) had a female householder with no husband present, 494 (3.3%) had a male householder with no wife present. There were 460 (3.1%) unmarried opposite-sex partnerships, and 131 (0.9%) same-sex married couples or partnerships. 5,400 households (36.3%) were made up of individuals, and 1,834 (12.3%) had someone living alone who was 65 years of age or older. The average household size was 2.29. There were 8,461 families (56.9% of all households); the average family size was 3.05.

The population was spread out, with 6,623 people (19.4%) under the age of 18, 2,526 people (7.4%) aged 18 to 24, 8,540 people (25.0%) aged 25 to 44, 9,904 people (29.0%) aged 45 to 64, and 6,516 people (19.1%) who were 65 years of age or older. The median age was 43.6 years. For every 100 females, there were 84.3 males. For every 100 females age 18 and over, there were 80.3 males.

The homeowner vacancy rate was 2.2%; the rental vacancy rate was 8.0%. 17,740 people (52.0% of the population) lived in owner-occupied housing units and 16,248 people (47.6%) lived in rental housing units.

During 2009–2013, Beverly Hills had a median household income of $86,141, with 8.8% of the population living below the federal poverty line.

2000

As of the census of 2000, there were 33,784 people, 15,035 households, and 8,269 families residing in the city. There were 15,856 housing units at an average density of 2,794.4/mi (1,079.7/km2). The racial makeup of the city was 85.06% White, 1.77% African American, 0.13% Native American, 7.05% Asian, 0.03% Pacific Islander, 1.50% from other races, and 4.46% from two or more races. Hispanic or Latino of any race were 4.63% of the population.

There were 15,035 households, out of which 24.4% had children under the age of 18 living with them, 43.8% were married couples living together, 8.1% had a female householder with no husband present, and 45.0% were non-families. 38.2% of all households were made up of individuals, and 11.3% had someone living alone who was 65 years of age or older. The average household size was 2.24 and the average family size was 3.02.

In the city, the population was spread out, with 20.0% under the age of 18, 6.3% from 18 to 24, 29.3% from 25 to 44, 26.8% from 45 to 64, and 17.6% who were 65 years of age or older. The median age was 41 years. For every 100 females, there were 83.5 males. For every 100 females age 18 and over, there were 79.4 males.

The median income for a household in the city was $70,945, and the median income for a family was $102,611. Males had a median income of $72,004 versus $46,217 for females. The per capita income for the city was $65,507. About 7.9% of families and 9.1% of the population were below the poverty line, including 9.5% of those under the age of 18 and 7.9% ages 65 or older.

Economy

Beverly Hills is home to one Fortune 500 company, Live Nation Entertainment. Since August 22, 2011, the headquarters of Metro-Goldwyn-Mayer has been located in Beverly Hills after a significant film history established close by on the main original studio lots in Culver City. The talent agencies United Talent Agency, William Morris Endeavor, Paradigm Talent Agency, The Gersh Agency, and Agency for the Performing Arts are based in Beverly Hills.

Hilton Hotels Corporation formerly had its corporate headquarters in Beverly Hills. The original headquarters of GeoCities (at first Beverly Hills Internet) was at 9401 Wilshire Boulevard in Beverly Hills.

The large Beverly Hills Oil Field has four urban drilling islands, which drill diagonally into the earth underneath the city. One drilling island occasioned a 2003 lawsuit representing former attendees of Beverly Hills High School, approximately 280 of which having suffered from cancers allegedly tied to the drilling operations. The oil site on the high school grounds is in the process of being shut down.

Top employers

According to the city's 2015 Comprehensive Annual Financial Report, the top employers in the city were:

Government

Municipal government

Beverly Hills is a general law city governed by a five-member City Council, including the mayor and vice mayor. The City Council hires a city manager to carry out policies and serve as executive officer. Until 2017, every odd-numbered year, either two or three members were elected for four-year terms. However, in 2017, the Council changed its cycle to conform with statewide elections; the first such election will be held in March 2020. Each March, the City Council meets and chooses one of its members as mayor and one as vice-mayor. As of April 2021, Robert Wunderlich is Mayor, Lili Bosse is Vice Mayor, and Lester Friedman, Julian Gold, and John Mirisch are members. George Chavez serves as City Manager.

County, state and federal representation

In the Los Angeles County Board of Supervisors, Beverly Hills is in the Third District, represented by Lindsey Horvath.

New and Existing Laws

On January 1, 2022, Beverly Hills became the first city in America to ban the sale of all tobacco products.  Smoking lounges and hotels are exempt from the new law.  The city council passed the law in June 2021. Flavored tobacco was already banned.

Education

Beverly Hills is served by Beverly Hills Unified School District, which includes two kindergarten-through-fifth-grade schools (Hawthorne and Horace Mann), one middle school (Beverly Vista) and Beverly Hills High School. One alternative school, Moreno High School, shares its campus with the aforementioned Beverly Hills High School.

Beverly Hills also has several private schools. Good Shepherd School, a PreK-8 school, is a part of the Roman Catholic Archdiocese of Los Angeles. Other private schools include Harkham Hillel Hebrew Academy.

Infrastructure

The Beverly Hills Police Department and the Beverly Hills Fire Department serve as emergency response agencies for the city.

The Los Angeles County Department of Health Services SPA 5 West Area Health Office serves Beverly Hills. The department operates the Simms/Mann Health and Wellness Center in Santa Monica, serving Beverly Hills.

The United States Postal Service operates the Beverly Hills Post Office at 325 North Maple Drive, the Crescent Post Office at 323 North Crescent Drive, the Beverly Post Office at 312 South Beverly Drive, and the Eastgate Post Office at 8383 Wilshire Boulevard. The former Beverly Hills Post Office was listed on the National Register of Historic Places on January 11, 1985.

Autonomous vehicles
In April 2016, the Beverly Hills City Council passed a resolution to create autonomous vehicles for public transportation within the next decade. Mayor John Mirisch said this was one of his top priorities during his tenure as mayor. "This is a game-changer for Beverly Hills and, we hope, for the region," said Mirisch in the press release. "Beverly Hills is the perfect community to take the lead to make this technology a reality. It is now both feasible and safe for autonomous cars to be on the road."

Media

Beverly Hills is served by free weekly newspapers The Beverly Hills Courier and Beverly Hills Weekly.

The BHUSD has a public-access television station called KBEV, which is run by the students of Beverly Hills High School.

Landmarks
Trousdale Estates is a 410-acre neighborhood of large, luxurious homes in Beverly Hills. It was primarily developed in the 1950s and early 1960s by Paul Trousdale, who petitioned the city to incorporate the land into Beverly Hills soon after purchasing it from The Doheny Family. Greystone Mansion, which is listed on the National Register of Historic Places, is in Trousdale Estates. The average sale price of homes in Trousdale is over $10 million.

 Beverly Gardens Park
 Beverly Hills 9/11 Memorial Garden
 Beverly Hills City Hall
 Beverly Hills High School
 Beverly Hills Hotel
 Beverly Hills Police Department
 Beverly Hills Public Library
 Beverly Hills Women's Club
 Beverly Wilshire Hotel
 Electric Fountain
 Greystone Mansion
 Greenacres
 La Cienega Park
 Misty Mountain
 Pickfair
 Rodeo Drive
 Roxbury Memorial Park
 Virginia Robinson Gardens
 Will Rogers Memorial Park

Notable people

In popular culture

Beverly Hills frequently appears in popular culture as a place of conspicuous wealth or luxury, although the actual demographics of the city are more complex. In some films, such as 1990's Pretty Woman, substantial filming took place in the city; in many others, however, such as Beverly Hills Cop (1984), little is shown besides establishing shots of landmarks such as the Beverly Hills Hotel and Rodeo Drive.

In television, the scene in the opening credits of The Andy Griffith Show (1960–1968), in which Sheriff Taylor and Opie carry fishing poles past a pond, was shot at the Franklin Canyon Reservoir north of the city, just west of Coldwater Canyon. The CBS sitcom The Beverly Hillbillies (1962–71) followed a hillbilly family who relocate to Beverly Hills from the Ozarks. The city also features in the name of the 1990s soap opera Beverly Hills, 90210, revolving around the lives of teenagers attending the fictional West Beverly Hills High School.

Sister cities
 Acapulco, Mexico
 Cannes, France
 Herzliya, Israel
 Pudong, China

See also
 List of largest houses in the Los Angeles Metropolitan Area

References

Bibliography
Beverly Hills: 1930–2005 By Marc Wanamaker 
Beverly Hills: An Illustrated History by Genevieve Davis 
Beverly Hills: Inside the Golden Ghetto By Walter Wagner Published 1976
"History of Beverly Hills." By Pierce E. Benedict. Published 1934.

External links

Beverly Hills City photographs
Beverly Hills article at Encyclopaedida Britannica
Beverly Hills profile from the Los Angeles Times

 
1914 establishments in California
Cities in Los Angeles County, California
Incorporated cities and towns in California
Populated places established in 1914
Populated places in the Santa Monica Mountains
Westside (Los Angeles County)
Enclaves in the United States